Trochonematidae is an extinct taxonomic family of fossil sea snails, marine gastropod molluscs in the superfamily Trochonematoidea.

This family has no subfamilies.

Genera 
 † Alanstukella Mazaev, 2020 
 † Amaurotoma Knight, 1945 
 † Knightinella Likharev, 1975 
 † Trochonema Salter, 1859 - the type genus
 † Vicnigoria Mazaev, 2019

References

External links 
 1913. Text-book of paleontology, page 530.
 Zittel, K. A. von. (1895). Grundzüge der Paläontologie (Paläozoologie), I Abteilung, Invertebrata. Oldenburg. München and Leipzig. viii + 971 p.
 Bouchet, P. & Rocroi, J.-P. (2005). Classification and nomenclator of gastropod families. Malacologia. 47 (1-2): 1-397.